Sedlo ( or) is a village in the Municipality of Kobarid in the Littoral region of Slovenia. It is located in the Breginj Combe.

The parish church in the settlement is dedicated to the Holy Cross.

References

External links

Sedlo on Geopedia

Populated places in the Municipality of Kobarid